Westlake (sometimes spelled out as "West Lake") is an extinct town in Twiggs County, in the U.S. state of Georgia. The GNIS classifies it as a populated place.

History
An early variant name was "Buzzard Roost". A post office called Buzzard Roost was established in 1872, the name was changed to West Lake in 1885, and the post office closed in 1925. The community was named for a lake west of the original town site.

References

Geography of Twiggs County, Georgia
Ghost towns in Georgia (U.S. state)